Jaylon Bather (born 31 December 1992) is a Bermudian footballer who plays for PHC Zebras and the Bermuda national football team.

Career

College
Bather attended Darton State College in 2011 and 2012, helping the team to a regional championship in the latter season.

Club
In his youth, Bather played for several programs in his native Bermuda. After starting out in the BYSP, he joined PHC Zebras, before leaving the club at the age of 12. In 2016, he moved abroad, joining English club Ilkeston in an effort to secure more time in the professional game. He would return to Bermuda following the 2016/17 season. In 2022, Bather returned to PHC Zebras, stating that he wished to give back to the club with which he started his career.

International
Bather made his senior international debut in March 2015, appearing in a 2–0 friendly victory over Grenada. Bather was a member of Bermuda's 2019 CONCACAF Gold Cup roster, and was a key member of the team that reached League A in the 2019–20 CONCACAF Nations League.

Career statistics

International

International Goals
Scores and results list Bermuda's goal tally first.

References

External links

1992 births
Living people
Bermudian footballers
Bermuda international footballers
Association football defenders
2019 CONCACAF Gold Cup players